Woodbridge Town F.C. is an English football club based in Woodbridge, Suffolk.

History
Woodbridge Town F.C. was formed at a meeting held on 23 July 1885, and the first match was played between the club's own members on a pitch at Farlingaye Hall. The club's first match, against St Helens of Ipswich, resulted in a 10–0 victory. The Suffolk County Football Association was formed in the same year, and the club were a founder member, as well as winning the first Suffolk Senior Cup by beating Ipswich Town 3–1 in the final at Portman Road.

In 1908–09 they won the Junior Cup by beating RFA Ipswich 2–1, and in 1912–13 were champions of the Ipswich and District League's Senior Division. They won the Junior Cup again in 1927, beating Southwold Town 4–2. In 1929 they reached the final of the Senior Cup, but lost 5–0 to Ipswich Town

The club struggled to find a permanent home, and played at five different grounds during the 1950s and 1960s. They won Division One of the Ipswich and District League and the Junior Cup in 1970–71. In 1977–78 they won the Senior Cup, beating Cranes 2–1.

They were relegated in 1982–83, but returned to the Senior Division as Division One champions in 1986–87, also winning the Junior Cup. They won the Senior Division in 1988–89 (by which time it had become the Suffolk & Ipswich League), and were promoted to the newly established Division One of the Eastern Counties League. In 1990 the club bought a new ground to replace Kingston Field, and the opening game in October saw a crowd of around 3,000 attend for a friendly against Arsenal.

In 1993 the club won the Senior Cup again, beating Stonham Aspal 5–2. The following season the club retained the cup, beating Saxmundham Sports 4–0, as well as finishing second in Division One and earning promotion to the Premier Division. In the same season they also won the Harwich Charity Cup and the Churchman Cup, as well as becoming the first Division One side to win the League Cup by beating Chatteris Town 2–0 in the final.

In 1998 the club won the League Cup again, beating Warboys Town 4–2 in the final. In 1998–99 they reached the quarter-finals of the FA Vase, attracting a record crowd for a competitive match (1,051) to the game against Thame United, which was lost 2–0 after extra time

Between 2004 and 2007 the team was managed by former Ipswich Town midfielder Mick Stockwell.

Honours
Eastern Counties League
Division One champions 2017–18
League Cup winners 1993–94, 1997–98
Suffolk & Ipswich League
Senior Division champions 1912–13, 1988–89
Division One champions 1986–87, 1970–71
League Cup winners 1979
Suffolk Senior Cup
Winners 1886, 1978, 1993, 1994, 2018
Suffolk Junior Cup
Winners 1909, 1927, 1971, 1987

Records
Attendance: 3,000 vs Arsenal, friendly match, 2 October 1990

References

External links
Club website

 
Association football clubs established in 1885
Eastern Counties Football League
Football clubs in Suffolk
1885 establishments in England
Woodbridge, Suffolk
Football clubs in England